Material world may refer to:
 All things matter
 The physical world
 Nature, the phenomena of the physical world, and life in general
As a proper noun:
 Material World (TV series), a Canadian television sitcom in the 1990s
 Material World (radio programme), a BBC Radio 4 science programme
 Material World: A Global Family Portrait, a 1994 photo essay by Peter Menzel

See also
 Living in the Material World, a 1973 album by George Harrison
 George Harrison: Living in the Material World, a 2011 documentary film directed by Martin Scorsese
 Material World Charitable Foundation, a charitable organisation founded by Harrison to coincide with the album
 "Spirits in the Material World", a 1981 song by The Police